Tajuria jalajala is a species of lycaenid or blue butterfly found in the Indomalayan realm (Philippines  and . Borneo)

Subspecies 
T. j. jalajala Philippines.
T. j. berenis Druce, 1896  Borneo
T. j. steffi Schröder & Treadaway, 1988

References

Tajuria